Typhoon Love is a 1926 American silent drama film directed by Norman Dawn and starring Mitchell Lewis, Ruth Clifford and Katherine Dawn. The plot follows two adventurers working on an opal mine and a captain who schemes against them, ultimately dying and freeing his daughter to marry one of them.

Cast
Mitchell Lewis		
Ruth Clifford
T. Roy Barnes
George Fisher
Katherine Dawn

References

Bibliography

External links

1926 drama films
1920s English-language films
American silent feature films
Silent American drama films
Films directed by Norman Dawn
American black-and-white films
1920s American films